Husbands for Rent is a 1927 American comedy film directed by Henry Lehrman and written by C. Graham Baker, Joseph Jackson and Jimmy Starr. The film stars Owen Moore, Helene Costello, Katherine Perry, John Miljan, Claude Gillingwater and Arthur Hoyt. The film was released by Warner Bros. on December 31, 1927.

Cast       
Owen Moore as Herbert Willis
Helene Costello as Molly Devoe
Katherine Perry as Doris Knight 
John Miljan as Hugh Frazer
Claude Gillingwater as Sir Reginald Knight
Arthur Hoyt as Waldo Squibbs
Helen Lynch as Maid
Hugh Herbert as Valet

Preservation status
The film is lost.

References

External links
 
 

1927 films
1920s English-language films
Silent American comedy films
1927 comedy films
Warner Bros. films
Films directed by Henry Lehrman
American silent feature films
Lost American films
1927 lost films
1920s American films